The following squads for the 2013 Philippine Peace Cup:

Philippines
Coach:  Michael Weiß

Chinese Taipei
Coach:  Chen Kuei-jen

Pakistan
Coach:  Mohammed Shamlan

References

squads
2013 in Philippine football